Centreville is a ghost town in the Cassiar Land District of British Columbia, Canada, northwest of the junction of McDame Creek and the Dease River.  It contained cabins and stores, and was a trading centre for miners working on McDame Creek in the 1800s.

References

Ghost towns in British Columbia